EMSA may stand for:

Acronyms 
Egyptian Medical Students' Association
Electron Microscopy Society of America former name of the Microscopy Society of America
Electrophoretic mobility shift assay
Emergency Medical Services Alliance, in Marion County, Florida, United States
Emergency Medical Services Authority, In Oklahoma City and Tulsa, OK
Emsa (Household goods) manufacturer from Germany 
Encoding Method for Signature Appendix, a method used in RSA cryptographic signing in PKCS #1
European Magnetic Sensors and Actuators
European Maritime Safety Agency
European Masters Sports Association, the organization responsible for bidding and placing athletic competitions
European Medical Students' Association, in Brussels, Belgium
European Multiple System Atrophy study group

Location 
 Emsa: a small archaeological site near Tetouan, Morocco